Sielce  is a village in the administrative district of Gmina Końskowola, within Puławy County, Lublin Voivodeship, in eastern Poland.

The village has a population of 643.

References

Sielce